John Waldie (April 22, 1833 – June 12, 1907) was a Canadian politician and businessman.

Biography
Born in Hawick, Roxburghshire, Scotland, he moved to Canada West when still a youth. When the rest of his family moved to Huron County to establish a farm, he decided to remain in Nelson Township, becoming a prominent wheat merchant. He was Reeve of Nelson Township for two years, and was instrumental in incorporating the Village of Wellington Square in 1873. After Wellington Square was amalgamated with Port Nelson to become the Village of Burlington late that year, he became its Reeve for five years. During that time, he was also Warden of Halton County for two years.

In 1885, he sold his interest in his business to his partner, and became a lumber baron, moving to Toronto in the process. He founded the Victoria Harbour Lumber Company (consolidating three mills then operating) that year, located at Victoria Harbour, Ontario. Many of the buildings he had constructed there have since been designated as heritage properties. He would acquire further mills in his lifetime, including one in Spragge, Ontario just one month before his death.

He was also the President of two tanneries, located at Collingwood and Burk's Falls, and was a director on the boards of the Toronto Paper Company (operating in Cornwall) and the Canada Coating Mills (located in Georgetown).

Waldie was also a director of the Bank of Toronto, and had also been vice-president of the Landed Banking and Loan Company in Hamilton, Ontario, which later became part of Canada Permanent Trust.

He was elected to the House of Commons of Canada as a Member of the Liberal Party in the 1887 election to represent the riding of Halton, later being re-elected in 1888, but defeated in the elections of 1891 and 1896. In that time, he developed a close friendship with Wilfrid Laurier, which proved useful after he left office.

Electoral record

Further reading

References

External links 

1833 births
1907 deaths
Businesspeople from Ontario
Liberal Party of Canada MPs
Members of the House of Commons of Canada from Ontario
Scottish emigrants to Canada
Canadian businesspeople in timber
People from Hawick